Deakin Law Review is an Australian peer-reviewed law review published biannually by Deakin University School of Law. It was founded in 1993.

English-language journals
General law journals
Biannual journals
Publications established in 1993
Australian law journals